Frances Rotblat (27 July 1946, London –  22 April 2021) was a British haematologist known for her contributions to the treatment of haemophilia.

Life
Frances Rotblat was born in London in 1946 to Mania and Michael Rotblat, Jewish refugees who had escaped the Warsaw Ghetto. Joseph Rotblat, a nuclear physicist and disarmament campaigner, was her uncle.

Rotblat attended the South Hampstead High School, and graduated from St Bartholomew's Hospital Medical College in physiology, medicine and surgery. She later obtained fellowships in pharmacology and haematology.

She died on 22 April 2021 from complications of diabetes.

Work
In 1979, Rotblat began work with Edward Tuddenham at the Royal Free Hospital in North London to isolate and stabilise the so-called Factor 8, a protein which haemophiliacs had a shortage of, leading to their blood not clotting. They extracted Factor 8 from cryoprecipitate, a plasma protein that was used at the time to inhibit bleeding, and after several stages of chemistry, used diisopropyl fluorophosphate, a nerve gas, to prevent enzymes from destroying the Factor 8. Rotblat and Tuddenham's innovation was to inject mice with the Factor 8 to cause the development of antibodies, which then were extracted from the mouse spleen, and concentrated into a pure sample of Factor 8. This was sent to Genentech, an American biotechnology company, for DNA sequencing, which was completed in 1984.

When funding for her work on haemophilia was stopped, Rotblat joined the UK Medicines Control Authority, vetting blood medications and vaccines before approval, where she remained till retirement.

Following the mad cow disease outbreak in the UK in the 1990s, most likely caused by consumption of tainted British beef, regulators were concerned that vaccines made from serums of British cows had been used in the population. Although by 1991 most vaccine manufacturers had switched to material from New Zealand cows (where the bovine disease had never occurred), there were still about 500,000 litres of British-origin material used in the manufacture of several vaccines. In 1999, Rotblat was asked by a Health department inquiry to investigate the issue, and she informed the inquiry that the theoretical risk of contamination was determined to be outweighed by the benefits of vaccination, and therefore the material was permitted to be used.

Selected publications

References 

1946 births
2021 deaths
People from London
Alumni of the Medical College of St Bartholomew's Hospital
Jewish British scientists
British haematologists
British women scientists